Raiymbek Batyr Mausoleum (Russian: Мавзолей Райымбек Батыра, tr. mavzolei raiymbek batyra) — is the mausoleum of the Kazakh hero Raiymbek, who fought against dzhungar invaders. It is located in the city of Almaty, on the homonymous .

Construction 
Raiymbek's tomb was destroyed during the Russian Civil War, between 1918-1922. In 1981, a granite stela was installed at the burial site. In 1992, the mausoleum was built on the gravesite, designed by architects B. Ybraev, Sh. Otepbaev and S. Agytayev. In 2017, by a resolution of the Almaty City akim, Raiymbek's mausoleum was transferred to the communal property of the city of Almaty.

Modern-day mausoleum 
The monument has an unusual shape, in the form of a pointed tent with a crescent on top, inside which there is a sarcophagus with the ashes of the hero. Also on the territory of mausoleum there is a spring and a prayer room.

In 2005, in honor of 300th anniversary of Raiymbek's birth, the deputy of Almaty mäslihat and general director of the corporation "Sana-Oi Invest" Daulet Abenov funded the creation and installation near the mausoleum of a symbolic Koran, made of black marble, where people can worship by laying his hands on it.

The sacredness of mausoleum is underscored by the fact that in his lifetime, Raiymbek was recognized as an "auliye", or "saint".

References 

Buildings and structures in Almaty
Mausoleums in Kazakhstan
Religious buildings and structures in Kazakhstan